Lurabee Glacier is a glacier  long, flowing northeast between the Scripps Heights and Finley Heights to the east coast of Palmer Land, Antarctica. This glacier was discovered by Sir Hubert Wilkins on December 20, 1928, on his pioneer Antarctic flight. He named it "Lurabee Channel" for Lurabee Shreck of San Francisco, in recognition of her aid in procuring equipment for this and an earlier Arctic flight, and for her editorial assistance on his book Flying the Arctic. The term channel has been amended to glacier, in keeping with the true nature of the feature.

See also
Hogmanay Pass

References

Glaciers of Palmer Land